The CumEx-Files is an investigation by a number of European news media outlets into a tax fraud scheme discovered by them in 2017. A network of banks, stock traders, and lawyers had obtained billions from European treasuries through suspected fraud and speculation involving dividend taxes. The five hardest hit countries may have lost at least $62.9 billion. Germany is the hardest hit country, with around $36.2 billion withdrawn from the German treasury. Estimated losses for other countries include at least €17 billion for France, €4.5 billion in Italy, €1.7 billion in Denmark and €201 million for Belgium.

The name "cum-ex" is derived from Latin, meaning "with without", and refers to the disappearing nature of the fraudulent dividend payments.

Method 
The network stole several billion Euros from the treasury, through what Correctiv calls a "cum-ex" trade: The participants in the network would lend each other shares in large companies, so that to tax authorities there would appear to be two owners of the shares, when there was only one. The bank that was used in stock trading would then issue a "confirmation" to the investor that tax on the dividend payment had been paid, without it being done. "It’s a bit like parents claiming a child benefit for two – or more – children when there is only one child in the family." writes Correctiv. This practice was outlawed in 2012.

The name "cum-ex" is derived from Latin, meaning "with without", and refers to the disappearing nature of the fraudulent dividend payments.

In cum-ex trades, shares with and without dividend rights were quickly traded between various market participants just before the payout date for the dividend, allowing traders to reclaim double the taxes.

Financial institutions in essence allowed two parties to simultaneously claim ownership of the same shares, therefore allowing both to claim tax rebates to which they were not entitled.

Authorities have since deemed the reclaims illegitimate, but at the time of the trades, this was less black and white, and a vast network of traders, analysts and lawyers were thought to be involved in the practice throughout the continent.

The elite tax firm Freshfields Bruckhaus Deringer gave tax advice which was used to justify the legality of the scheme. In November 2019, Ulf Johannemann, a former Freshfield lawyer was arrested.

In May 2020, the European Banking Authority announced a 10-point action plan to enhance the future regulatory framework surrounding dividend arbitrage trading schemes. According to the report, in some countries, the cum ex deals are not criminal offences.

Danish dividend scandal
In 2010, in an audit report, the Danish Ministry of Taxation was found to have ignored warnings on multiple occasions of a tax loophole concerning dividend tax.

In June 2020, it was reported by investigators that such transactions took advantage of European rules on the taxing of dividends, which made it possible to get refunds by using a combination of short sales and future transactions.

Lawsuits in France 
A parliamentary information mission on tax evasion of the National Assembly has also published a report on the results of the fight against cross-border malicious financial engineering.

Discovery 
The Danish State Commissioner August Schäfer first warned of the practice in 1992, after the testimony of five whistleblowers. However, the practice remained widespread until an administrative assistant in the German Federal Central Tax Office noticed abnormally large tax rebate claims from a US pension fund.

Implicated institutions 
Various banks and other financial institutions were involved in these alleged trades. Among those named in the leaked files include Macquarie Bank, Deutsche Bank, HypoVereinsbank, M. M. Warburg, Maple Bank, Merrill Lynch, KPMG, Ernst & Young, Investec,  and Freshfields. Investigations revealed that since 2012 Investec had provided the Dutch broker Frank Vogel with more than €12 billion to facilitate his alleged tax arbitrage scheme.

See also
Dividend stripping
Sanjay Shah

References

External links

 from Correctiv

Tax fraud
News leaks
Investigative journalism
Financial scandals
2017 scandals
2017 in economics